Julian Moser (born 1987) is a German cinematographer, photographer and film producer who specializes in music videos and documentary film work.

Biography 
Julian Moser grew up near the city of Würzburg. He started his career as an assistant for the awarded literary magazine Druckfrisch on ARD and worked with Bad Banks writer Oliver Kienle.

As director of photography he has collaborated with musicians such as Tangerine Dream, Nine Inch Nails member Alessandro Cortini, Hainbach and singer Emel Mathlouti, known for Kelmti Horra, which became an anthem for the Arab Spring. He worked for CNN´s short documentary platform Great Big Story, ZDF and Arte.

In 2017 he and his brother Felix Moser founded Moserfilm, a visual production project, based in Berlin. Their music videos and documentaries were awarded and selected to Ars Electronica Festival, Boddinale, Portland Unknown Film Festival and Backup Festival Weimar.

His upcoming collaboration with Chinese writer Qinyuan Lei for the documentary feature The One Who Runs Away Is The Ghost (working title: Children Of Huaqiangbei) was selected to the International Competition at International Documentary Festival Amsterdam 2021. It won the Grenzgänger fellowship from Robert Bosch Stiftung 2018 and Docs in Progress at Visions du Réel Film Festival 2020.

References

External links 
Julian Moser Website

Moserfilm Website

German film producers
People from Würzburg
1987 births
Living people
German cinematographers